Akto County (also known as Aqtu, Aktu, or Aketao) is a county in Kizilsu Kyrgyz Autonomous Prefecture, Xinjiang Uygur Autonomous Region, China. The county borders Tajikistan and Kyrgyzstan and has two towns, 11 townships, four state-owned farms and a plant nursery under its jurisdiction with the county seat being Akto Town.

Akto is the westernmost border county of China. A point north of the Markansu River on the China–Tajikistan border is the westernmost point of China. The county is located in the southwest of Xinjiang Uygur Autonomous Region, east of the Pamir Plateau, and the western edge of the Tarim Basin. It is located between 73°26'5" - 76°43'31" east longitude and 37°41'28" - 39°29'55" north latitude. It is bordered by Wuqia County and Shufu County to the north, by Shule County and 41st Regiment of the XPCC across Yuepuhu River to the northeast, by Yengisar County (Yingjisha), Yarkant County (Shache) to the east, by Taxkorgan Tajik Autonomous County (Tashkurgan) to the south. The west and south-west are connected with the China–Kyrgyzstan border and the China–Tajikistan border; the border line is more than 380 kilometers long.

Name
Akto means 'white mountain' in the Kyrgyz language, referring to snowy mountains.

History

In the early years of the Western Han dynasty, the land of the present Akto County was under the jurisdiction of three Kingdoms of Shule, Puli and Yilai. In 60 BC, the Han dynasty set up the Protectorate of the Western Regions in Wulei Fortress (near the present Yungou, Dongye Town in Luntai County), and Akto was under its jurisdiction. During the Three Kingdoms period, Akto was still under the jurisdiction of the Wei State. During the Jin dynasty, Akto County was part of Shule Kingdom of Jin. In 658, with the establishment of Kara-Khanid Khanate, most of Akto was under its jurisdiction. In 1134, Akto was part of West Liao with the East Kara-Khanid Khanate reconciled to West Liao. In 1226, the Southern Tianshan was in the territory of Chagatai Khanate, with Akto under its control. With the establishment of the Eastern Chagatai Khanate in 1347, Akto was one of the dominions of the khanate supervisor Hudaida. Akto was part of Yarkent Khanate in 1514. In 1678, the Dzungar began to rule. After the Qing dynasty calmed the Revolt of the Altishahr Khojas in 1759, the land was ruled by Kashgar and Yarkand officials. Appointed the seat of officials of circuits, prefectures and counties in southern Xinjiang in 1883, Akto was under the jurisdiction of Yengisar Independent Prefecture, Shule Independent Prefecture and Puli Independent Sub-prefecture of Shache.

Akto County was established in August 1954 from parts of Yengisar, Shufu, Taxkorgan (present Tashkurgan, Puli) and Wuqia counties. The present Yumai Township was from the 6th district in Yengisar, Piral Township and Barin Township from the 7th district in Yengisar (Yingjisha), Kizilto Township from the 8th district in Yengisar, Qiarlon Township from 4th district of Qiarlon in Puli County, Blunko Township from 5th district of Blunko in Puli and two townships of Bostanterak District in Wuqia County, Auytak Town from Auytak Township in Shufu County, Karekayqik Township from Qlukbash Township in Shufu.

In April 1990, the Baren Township riot occurred in Barin Township.

In June 1996, Aisha Awazi, Uyghur imam of a mosque in the county, was arrested in connection with reportedly appointing himself imam in 1992, being strongly critical of communists as pagans and organizing 120 like-minded persons; he is listed as a political prisoner.

The 2007 Xinjiang raid occurred in the county.

Geography

Akto County is located in the central hinterland of Asia, the westernmost part of China, the southwest of Xinjiang Uygur Autonomous Region, the eastern Pamir Plateau, and the western edge of the Tarim Basin. It is located between east longitude 73°26'5" - 76°43'31" and north latitude 37°41'28" - 39°29'55". Its maximum length from north to south is 283.2 kilometers long from the middle section of Maltabar Mountain in the northwest to The Kokluk Farm in Kuslap Township in the southeast; The maximum length from west to east is 216 kilometers long from Subash Village in Bulunkou Township in the southwest to the Jamaterak Township in the northeast. The county terrain is high in the northwest and low in the southeast, with a total area of 24,555 square kilometers.

Akto County is located in the three major geographic regions of the Pamirs, the northern slopes of the Kunlun Mountains and the oasis on the western edge of the Tarim Basin. The landform is dominated by mountains, with the mountainous area accounting for 96.39% of the total area of the county, and the mountainous areas generally at an altitude of 4,000-5,000 meters. The Kungay Mountain in the northwest is the boundary mountain of the county with Wuqia County, with an elevation of 5,753.7 meters. The Sarikol Range in the southwest is more than 4,500 meters above sea level; the highest peak of Kongur Tagh in the central part is 7,719 meters above sea level, the peak of Kongur Tiube is 7,530 meters high above sea level, and the peak of Muztagh Ata is 7,541 meters high. There are 66 snow-capped peaks in the territory, including 36 large ice peaks. The mountaintops have snow all the year round, and there are glaciers of different sizes around the peaks. The landform features severe drought and erosion, bare mountain and sparse vegetation. Due to the different rock types of the mountains, they are gray, black, yellow, red and white bare mountains.

The midwestern part of the county is on the Pamir Plateau. Several giant mountains on the Asian continent - the Himalayas, the Karakoram Range, the Kunlun Mountains, the Tian Shan Mountains and the Hindu Kush Mountains are all gathered here. The main mountain range of the Pamirs is Kongur -Muztagh Mountains, which is mainly in Akto County. It extends southward to Tashkurgan County and extends to the northeast to Yengisar and Kargilik counties. Muztagh is the boundary mountain between Akto County and Tashkurgan County; the top of the mountain is accumulating ice and snow, and the thickness of snow is more than 100 meters. There are more than 40 modern glaciers distributed below the snow line. The thickness of the ice sheet is 100 meters. The glacial meltwater is the main source of agricultural irrigation in the county, and it is also the main source of supply for the Gez River and the Kushan River.

The southern part of Akto County is the northern slope of Kunlun Mountains, which is the main mountain of the Kunlun. In addition to the Jogori Peak, the other three famous peaks of Muztagh Ata, Kongur Tagh and Kongur Tiube are almost all in Akto. Kunlun is famous for its jade production. It is located in the mountains of Akto in the upper reaches of the Yarkand River. There are many jade mines. These jade stones, exposed in the rock formations by the river, are washed into the riverbed in the lower reaches, and stepping on jade in the Yarkand River has become a production activity and industry that the local people have been engaged in for thousands of years.

The northeastern part of the county is an oasis, located on the southwestern edge of the Tarim Basin and part of the Tarim Oasis. The plain agricultural areas in the county are mainly divided into two parts: one is the front flood fan of the Pamir Mountains, and the other is the Gez-Kushan River Delta. These two plains, in terms of large landform types, belong to the Kashgar Delta and form an oasis on the southwest edge of the Tarim Basin. The Gez-Kushan River Delta, located in the southern part of the Kashgar Plain, the northern part of the northern slope of the Pamir-West Kunlun Mountain Range, the triangle between the Gez and the Kushan rivers, covers an area of about 800 square kilometers, and has a distribution population of more than 100,000, accounting for about 68% of the total population of the county. It is composed of the flood of the Gez river and the Kushan River - alluvial fan and Gez River - the dympastain plain saticity of the Yuepuhu River, mainly including Akto Town, Yumai, Barin, Pilal, Jamaterak and other agricultural areas. The area is flat, at an altitude of about 1,200 to 1,500 meters, with abundant water and fertile land.

Climate

Administrative divisions

The county has 12 township-level administrative divisions under its jurisdiction, with five state-owned farms.

2 towns and 10 townships
 Akto Town
 Oytak Town
 Ujme Township (Ojma,  / Yumai )
 Pilal Township ( / Pilale )
 Barin Township (Baren)
 Karakeqik Township
 Jamaterek Township (Jiamatiereke )
 Muji Township (مۇجى يېزىسى )
 Bulungkol Township (بۇلۇڭكۆل يېزىسى / Bulunkou )
 Kizilto Township (قىزىلتو يېزىسى / Keziletao )
 Qarlung Township (چارلۇڭ يېزىسى / Qia'erlong )
 Tar Tajik Township (تار تاجىك يېزىسى / Ta'er )

2 state-owned farms of Akto County
 Turtay Farm of Akto County
 Akdala Farm of Akto County

2 state-owned nurseries of Akto County 
 Signature Animal Nursery
 Plant Nursery

1 state-owned forest farm of Kizilsu Prefecture
 Forest Farm of Kizilsu

Demographics

Akto County has a large Uyghur majority, numbering 172,408 in 2018, or 73.64% of the county's population. The largest minority in Akto County are the Kyrgyz (including the Akto Turkmens), who number 47,394 in 2018, comprising 20.24% of the county's population. Other sizable minorities in the county include the Han Chinese and Mountain Tajiks, with populations of 7,864 and 6,018, respectively, comprising 3.36% and 2.57% of the county's population in 2018.

Transportation
Akto is served by the Kashgar-Hotan Railway.

Gallery

Notes

See also
 China–Tajikistan border
 List of extreme points of China

References 

County-level divisions of Xinjiang
Kizilsu Kyrgyz Autonomous Prefecture